I Can Be may refer to:

"I Can Be" (Taio Cruz song), a song by British pop/R&B singer Taio Cruz
"I Can Be" (Ida song), a song by Danish singer Ida
"I Can Be", a song by American R&B singer Aaliyah
"I Can Be a Firefighter", an episode of Barney & Friends (season 3, episode 4)

See also
All I Can Be, an album by country singer Collin Raye